Scott Emile Lagasse Jr. (born January 31, 1981) is an American professional stock car racing driver. He formerly drove in the NASCAR Camping World Truck Series. He is the son of former sports car and NASCAR driver Scott Lagasse Sr.

He is the owner of Scott Lagasse Racing (TeamSLR), which is located in St. Augustine, Florida. TeamSLR currently operates a Trans Am Road Race program, dirt late model race team, show car program and a NASCAR team. The team is currently building a new headquarters in St. Augustine.

Racing career
Lagasse Jr. is a former member of Chip Ganassi Racing's driver development program. He has also driven in a total of 14 ARCA (Automobile Racing Club of America) races in 2006, 2007, 2008 for Cunningham Motorsports and Venturini Motorsports, winning twice – Kansas and Chicagoland Speedway. In 2003 and 2004, besides graduating from college with honors, he was racing dirt cars and competed on a limited schedule in the ASA National Touring Series. In just 12 starts, Lagasse racked up 8 Top 10, 5 Top 5 and a win at Kentucky Speedway. From 1998 through 2002 he won over 25 races on dirt and asphalt in modifieds, Sportsman and late models.

Lagasse made his NASCAR Busch Series debut at the Phoenix International Raceway in 2005. He started 33rd while driving the No. 40 Dodge for FitzBradshaw Racing and he finished 40th after he was involved in a crash on the 81st of 200 laps. His best starting position in a part-time season was 18th at the Dover International Speedway, and his best finish was 22nd at the Milwaukee Mile. Lagasse originally was signed by Ganassi for the 2006 Busch Series season, and Dodge wanted to keep him in their camp, so it moved him to a third Truck team at Bobby Hamilton Racing after Ganassi failed to secure sponsorship. He appeared in 10 races in 2006 for Hamilton, with a season-best 18th-place finish at the Atlanta Motor Speedway.

In 2007, he made two Busch Series starts in the No. 41 Juicy Fruit Dodge for Chip Ganassi Racing, and he drove the No. 16 Truck for Xpress Motorsports at Dover, finishing 21st.

Lagasse drove the No. 20 Ford for JTG Racing in the first eight races of the 2008 NASCAR Craftsman Truck Series season; the No. 11 Toyota for 21 NASCAR Nationwide Series races with CJM Racing in 2009, where he posted three top-10 finishes; and the No. 43 Nationwide Ford for 14 races for Baker Curb Racing in 2010, with a season-best eighth-place finish at Phoenix.

He drove his own SLR Chevrolets in 2012 and 2013, concentrating on both Nationwide Series races at the Daytona International Speedway and the season-finale at Homestead-Miami Speedway, before making two Nationwide starts in 2014 and 2015.

In 2017, Lagasse joined JGL Racing's No. 24 car at Daytona and also drove the No. 24 truck for GMS Racing in replacement of an ineligible Justin Haley. Later in the year, he was the part-time driver of Richard Childress Racing's No. 3 Xfinity team, splitting the ride with Ty Dillon.

After not racing in the series in 2018, Lagasse returned to the NASCAR Xfinity Series in 2019, driving the No. 4 Chevrolet for JD Motorsports at Daytona. He made his Truck return a year later at the Daytona road course event for On Point Motorsports.

Cancer survivor
In 2015, Lagasse had surgery for colon cancer. He used a bond with fellow-cancer patient Reece King, who fought a rare form of leukemia for three years. Both celebrated their remission by sharing the stage during driver introductions before the 2016 Subway Firecracker 250 Xfinity Series race at the Daytona International Speedway. Lagasse since has forged a relationship with Stand Up to Cancer.

Personal life
Lagasse Jr. was born on January 31, 1981, in St. Augustine, Florida. He attended St. Joseph Academy Catholic High School. As a student, Lagasse Jr. played basketball before graduating with a Florida academic scholarship. Afterward, he proceeded to pursue an associate's degree at the University of Central Florida, while competing in local off-road and asphalt races on weekends. He continued his education at Flagler College, where he pursued a bachelor's degree in business administration. Lagasse Jr. graduated with honors from Flagler College in 2004, while competing in the American Speed Association National Touring Series.

Lagasse Jr. is a spokesperson for Florida Department of Transportation's 'Alert Today Florida' campaign, which raises awareness about pedestrian and bicyclist safety. In 2015, he established a  charity bike event at Daytona International Speedway. The event, called Champions Ride for Bicycle Safety, attracts professional bicyclists, NASCAR drivers, and triathletes to support the 'Alert Today Florida' campaign. He is married to his wife Kelley, and has one daughter, who was born in 2015.

Motorsports career results

NASCAR
(key) (Bold – Pole position awarded by qualifying time. Italics – Pole position earned by points standings or practice time. * – Most laps led.)

Xfinity Series

Gander RV & Outdoors Truck Series

 Season still in progress
 Ineligible for series points

ARCA Racing Series
(key) (Bold – Pole position awarded by qualifying time. Italics – Pole position earned by points standings or practice time. * – Most laps led.)

References

Scott Lagasse Jr. to race for Boy Scouts

External links

 
 

Living people
1981 births
People from St. Augustine, Florida
Racing drivers from Florida
NASCAR drivers
ARCA Menards Series drivers
Flagler College alumni
Trans-Am Series drivers
Chip Ganassi Racing drivers
Richard Childress Racing drivers